Egidijus Juodvalkis (born 8 April 1988) is a Lithuanian former road cyclist.

Major results

2008
 4th Overall Dookoła Mazowsza
 9th Overall Five Rings of Moscow
2009
 1st  National Road Race Championships
2010
 3rd Omloop van het Waasland
 5th Arno Wallaard Memorial
 6th GP Stad Zottegem
 6th Grand Prix de la ville de Pérenchies
 10th Nationale Sluitingprijs
2011
 5th Overall Tour de Picardie
1st Stage 1
 10th Dwars door de Antwerpse Kempen
2012
 2nd Omloop van het Waasland
 5th GP Stad Zottegem
 5th National Road Race Championships
2013
 1st De Kustpijl Heist
 4th National Road Race Championships
 5th Grand Prix Pino Cerami
2014
 5th National Road Race Championships
 7th Ronde van Overijssel
 8th Ronde van Zeeland Seaports
2015
 3rd National Road Race Championships

References

1988 births
Living people
Lithuanian male cyclists